"Two Sisters" is a song by British rock band Fiction Plane.
It was released on 22 May 2007 as the lead single from their second studio album, Left Side of the Brain (2007). The song was written by Joe Sumner.

Charts

References

2007 singles
2007 songs